Jonathan Richard "Jono" Pryor is a New Zealand radio and television personality best known as the cohost of Jono and Ben. Pryor worked for The Rock radio station for over 15 years, before moving to The Edge in 2017 to cohost The Edge Afternoons with Jono, Ben & Sharyn with Ben Boyce and Sharyn Casey. Pryor starred in Amped and The Jono Project on C4, before he began co-hosting Jono and Ben at Ten on Three alongside Boyce in 2012. In 2015, the show moved to prime time at 7:30pm, re-branded as Jono and Ben. The show was cancelled at the end of 2018. Pryor and Boyce now host the breakfast show on The Hits, and soon a TV show on TVNZ.

Personal life
Jono Pryor is married to Jennifer with whom he has two children, son Oscar John Pryor (born roughly 21 February 2010) and daughter Poppy Pryor (born 3 November 2012).

See also
 List of New Zealand television personalities

References

External links 
 Jono and Ben
 Jono, Ben & Sharyn

Living people
New Zealand radio presenters
New Zealand television presenters
People educated at Saint Kentigern College
People from Auckland
1981 births
The Rock (radio network)
New Zealand comedians
New Zealand male comedians
The Edge (radio station)